Threatened ecological community is a term used in Australia for ecosystems that are in danger of being lost due to some threatening process. Federally, threatened ecological communities are identified and protected under the Environment Protection and Biodiversity Conservation Act 1999. Some states also have legislation to cover these. In New South Wales, for example, ecosystems may be gazetted as threatened under the Threatened Species Conservation Act 1995, and in Western Australia they may be protected under the Wildlife Conservation Act 1950.

External links
 Threatened ecological communities recognised under the Environment Protection and Biodiversity Conservation Act 1999
 Threatened ecological communities in WA
 Threatened ecological communities in NSW

See also
 List of threatened ecological communities of Australia
 List of threatened ecological communities of Western Australia

Natural history of Australia
Nature conservation in Australia